Sata is a traditional dish from the Malaysian state of Terengganu, consisting of spiced fish meat wrapped in banana leaves and cooked on a grill. It is a type of Malaysian fish cake. The main ingredients of sata are grated coconut, sardines, ginger, onions and chili peppers. 

Sata is not to be confused with satay, another dish popular in Malaysia.

See also
 Keropok lekor, another fish-based snack from Terengganu
 Pepes, the Indonesian version of cooking in banana leaf
 Otak-otak, a somewhat similar dish popular in Indonesia, Malaysia and Singapore.
 List of Malay dishes

References 
  . 

Malaysian cuisine
Malay cuisine
Fish dishes